Stanley Robert Clarke (31 July 1938 – 2018) was an English competition swimmer.

Swimming career
Clarke swam for Great Britain in the Olympics and European championships. Clarke won a silver medal in the 4 × 100 m freestyle relay at the 1962 European Aquatics Championships.  He finished seventh in the same event at the 1960 Summer Olympics. He represented England in the freestyle events at the 1958 British Empire and Commonwealth Games in Cardiff, Wales. Four years later he won double bronze at the 1962 British Empire and Commonwealth Games in Perth, Western Australia.

He also won the 1960 ASA National Championship 100 metres freestyle title and the 200 metres freestyle. As of 2012, he was still competing and winning national titles in the masters category.

See also
 List of Commonwealth Games medallists in swimming (men)

References

1939 births
2018 deaths
Sportspeople from London
English male swimmers
European Aquatics Championships medalists in swimming
Olympic swimmers of Great Britain
Swimmers at the 1960 Summer Olympics
Commonwealth Games medallists in swimming
Commonwealth Games bronze medallists for England
Swimmers at the 1958 British Empire and Commonwealth Games
Swimmers at the 1962 British Empire and Commonwealth Games
Medallists at the 1962 British Empire and Commonwealth Games